Damon Slye (born June 15, 1962) is a computer game designer, director, and programmer. In 1984 he founded Dynamix with Jeff Tunnell in Eugene, Oregon.  He is best known for creating the historic flight simulations Red Baron, A-10 Tank Killer, and Aces of the Pacific.

Slye's first product was Stellar 7, an action game for the Apple II which used 3D wireframe graphics. He followed it up with Arcticfox, the first original title Electronic Arts published for the new Amiga computer.

In 1994 Slye left Dynamix and the game industry, saying that he wanted a "sabbatical" to study math and physics as well as "playing chess, and skiing, and playing basketball, and doing a lot of reading", but expected to be "building products again" in a year. He founded Mad Otter Games in 2007.

Games
 Stellar 7 (1982), Penguin Software
 Arcticfox (1986), Electronic Arts
 Skyfox II (1987), Electronic Arts
 Abrams Battle Tank (1988), Electronic Arts
 Project Firestart (1989), Electronic Arts
 MechWarrior (1989), Activision
 Deathtrack (1989), Activision
 David Wolf: Secret Agent (1989), Dynamix
 A-10 Tank Killer (1989), Dynamix
 Stellar 7 (1990), Dynamix
 Red Baron (1990), Dynamix
 Red Baron: Mission Builder (1992), Dynamix
 Aces of the Pacific (1992), Dynamix
 Aces of the Pacific, Expansion Disk, WWII:1946 (1992), Dynamix
 Aces Over Europe (1993), Dynamix
 Ace of Aces (2008), Instant Action
 Villagers and Heroes (2011), Mad Otter Games

References

External links

1962 births
Living people
Place of birth missing (living people)
Video game programmers
Video game designers